Prince Zheng of the First Rank (hošoi ujen cin wang), or simply Prince Zheng, was the title of a princely peerage used in China during the Manchu-led Qing dynasty (1644–1912). It was also one of the 12 "iron-cap" princely peerages in the Qing dynasty, which meant that the title could be passed down without being downgraded.

The first bearer of the title was Jirgalang (1599–1655), the sixth son of Šurhaci. He was awarded the title in 1636 by his cousin, Huangtaiji, the son and successor of Nurhaci (the founder of the Qing dynasty). When the title was passed down to Jirgalang's son, Jidu (1633–1660), it was renamed to Prince Jian of the First Rank (or simply Prince Jian) and given "iron-cap" status. The title was restored to its original name, "Prince Zheng of the First Rank", during the reign of the Qianlong Emperor (r. 1735–1796). The title was passed down over ten generations, and held by eight princes as Prince Zheng and nine princes as Prince Jian.

Members of the Prince Zheng / Prince Jian peerage

 Jirgalang (1599–1655), Šurhaci's sixth son, held the title Prince Zheng of the First Rank from 1636 to 1655, posthumously honoured as Prince Zhengxian of the First Rank (鄭獻親王)
 Jidu (濟度; 1633–1660), Jirgalang's second son, held the title Prince Jian of the First Rank from 1657 to 1660, posthumously honoured as Prince Jianchun of the First Rank (簡純親王)
 Desai (德塞; 1654–1670), Jidu's third son, held the title Prince Jian of the First Rank from 1661 to 1670, posthumously honoured as Prince Jianhui of the First Rank (簡惠親王)
 Labu (喇布; 1654–1681), Jidu's second son, held the title Prince Jian of the First Rank from 1670 to 1681, posthumously stripped of his title in 1682
 Yabu (雅布; 1658–1701), Jidu's fifth son, held the title Prince Jian of the First Rank from 1683 to 1701, posthumously honoured as Prince Jianxiu of the First Rank (簡修親王)
 Ya'erjiang'a (雅爾江阿; 1658–1732), Yabu's eldest son, held the title Prince Jian of the First Rank from 1703 to 1726, stripped of his title in 1726
 Shenbaozhu (神保住; 1696–1759), Yabu's 14th son, held the title Prince Jian of the First Rank from 1726 to 1748, stripped of his title in 1748
 Depei (德沛; 1688–1752), Fucun's son, held the title Prince Jian of the First Rank from 1748 to 1752, posthumously honoured as Prince Jianyi of the First Rank (簡儀親王)
 Qitong'a (奇通阿; 1701–1763), Basai's son, held the title Prince Jian of the First Rank from 1752 to 1763, posthumously honoured as Prince Jianqin of the First Rank (簡勤親王)
 Fengnaheng (豐訥亨; 1723–1775), Qitong'a's son, held the title Prince Jian of the First Rank from 1763 to 1775, posthumously honoured as Prince Jianke of the First Rank (簡恪親王)
 Jihana (積哈納; 1758–1794), Fengnaheng's son, held the title Prince Zheng of the First Rank from 1776 to 1794, posthumously honoured as Prince Zhenggong of the First Rank (鄭恭親王)
 Ulgungga (烏爾恭阿; 1778–1846), Jihana's son, held the title Prince Zheng of the First Rank from 1794 to 1846, posthumously honoured as Prince Zhengshen of the First Rank (鄭慎親王)
 Duanhua (1807–1861), Ulgungga's third son, held the title Prince Zheng of the First Rank from 1846 to 1861, stripped of his title in 1861
 Yueling (岳齡; 1849–1866), Yuyang's son and Baoyi's adoptive son, held the title of a buru bafen fuguo gong from 1862 to 1864
 Chengzhi (承志; 1843–1882), Xilang'a's son, held the title Prince Zheng of the First Rank from 1864 to 1871, stripped of his title in 1871
 Qingzhi (慶至; 1814–1878), Airen's son and Songde's adoptive son, held the title Prince Zheng of the First Rank from 1871 to 1878, posthumously honoured as Prince Zhengshun of the First Rank (鄭順親王)
 Kaitai (凱泰; 1871–1900), Qingzhi's son, held the title Prince Zheng of the First Rank from 1878 to 1900, posthumously honoured as Prince Zhengke of the First Rank (鄭恪親王)
 Zhaoxu (照煦; 1900–1950), Kaitai's son, held the title Prince Zheng of the First Rank from 1902 to 1912

Family tree

|-
|Legend:

See also
 Royal and noble ranks of the Qing dynasty

References
 

Qing dynasty princely peerages
Peerages of the Bordered Blue Banner